Aaron Scott Mills (born July 8, 1972) is an American former Arena Football League (AFL) kicker who, in a career lasting two years, played for the San Jose SaberCats (1995–1996). He holds the AFL league record for the longest field goal, with a 63-yard field goal in a 1996 game.

High school career
Playing football at Satellite High School in Satellite Beach, Florida, Mills was a two-time All-State selection as both kicker and punter, and also participated in the Florida-Georgia High School All-Star Game after his senior year.

College career
Mills was a four-year letterman at Stanford University and was both, a kicker and a punter. As a junior punter, he averaged 42.2 yards per punt and was selected All-Pac-10 first team selection.

He currently lives in Las Vegas, Nevada.

References

External links
 Stats at ArenaFan

1972 births
Living people
People from Satellite Beach, Florida
American football placekickers
American football punters
Stanford Cardinal football players
San Jose SaberCats players